Álvaro Gutiérrez Custodio (born 30 December 2000), commonly known as Guti, is a Spanish footballer who plays as a midfielder for Getafe CF B.

Club career
Born in Leganés, Community of Madrid, Guti joined CF Fuenlabrada's youth setup in September 2016. He was promoted to the reserves ahead of the 2019–20 season, and made his senior debut on 15 September 2019 by starting in a 2–2 home draw against CD Betis San Isidro.

Guti scored his first senior goal on 27 October 2019, netting his team's third in a 5–2 away routing of EMF Aluche. The following 23 February, he scored a brace in a 4–0 home success over AD Sporting Bazán.

Guti made his first team debut on 8 August 2020, coming on as a late substitute for Alberto Fernández in a 1–2 away loss at Deportivo de La Coruña in the Segunda División championship, as several of first team players were out due to COVID-19 pandemic occurring in the squad.

On 8 September 2021, Guti signed for Tercera División RFEF side AD Torrijos CF. The following 4 February, he moved to Getafe CF, being initially assigned to the reserves also in the fifth level.

References

External links

1999 births
Living people
People from Leganés
Spanish footballers
Footballers from the Community of Madrid
Association football midfielders
Segunda División players
Tercera Federación players
Divisiones Regionales de Fútbol players
CF Fuenlabrada B players
CF Fuenlabrada footballers
Getafe CF B players